Solomon Opoku (born 18 August 1992) is a Ghanaian professional footballer who plays as a forward for Ghanaian Premier League side Karela United.

Club career 
Opoku previously played for then Aduana Stars from 2011 to 2014, before moving to Nigeria to join Abia Warriors in 2017.  In 2020, he moved back to Ghana and joined Western Region-based club Karela United ahead of the 2020–21 Ghana Premier League.

International career 
Opoku was called up to the local Black Stars, Ghana A' national football team in November 2012 whilst playing for Aduana Stars.

References

External links 
 

Living people
1992 births
Ghanaian footballers
Association football forwards
Ghana Premier League players
Nigeria Professional Football League players
Aduana Stars F.C. players
Karela United FC players
Abia Warriors F.C. players